Halieutopsis stellifera, also known as the starry deepsea batfish, is a species of fish in the family Ogcocephalidae.

It is found in the Indo-West Pacific Ocean.

References

Ogcocephalidae
Marine fish genera
Fish described in 1912
Taxa named by Hugh McCormick Smith
Taxa named by Lewis Radcliffe